The Collaboration for AIDS Vaccine Discovery (CAVD) is an international network of scientists, research organizations, and promoters of HIV vaccine research.


Partners
The CAVD was founded in 2006 when the Bill & Melinda Gates Foundation donated $287 million USD to promote HIV vaccine research. The CAVD itself supports the Global HIV Vaccine Enterprise. The network comprises many individual institutions.

References

External links
 

HIV/AIDS research organisations
HIV vaccine research
Vaccination-related organizations
International medical and health organizations